Ludwig Pfyffer (1524, Lucerne – 17 March 1594) was a Swiss military leader, spokesman for Roman Catholic interests in the cantons, chief magistrate of Lucerne, and probably the most important Swiss political figure in the latter half of the 16th century.

Early career
For many years an active and intrepid warrior in the service of France, Pfyffer won fame by safely leading the royal family of Charles IX from Meaux to Paris while under Huguenot attack (1567).

Defender of Catholic Church
Elected chief magistrate for Lucerne in 1571, Pfyffer ruled there until his death.  He made the city the centre of Catholic Counter-Reformation activity in Switzerland. His Golden League (1586) (also called the Borromean League after Cardinal Carlo Borromeo) nearly led to the destruction of the Swiss Confederation.  The alliance of the seven Catholic cantons pledged itself to use armed force to expel heretics.  Its elevation of religious interests severely strained the civil union.  The canton of Appenzell divided along religious lines. 

Pfyffer established close relations with the Catholic League of Philip II of Spain and Henri I, Duc de Guise.  He concluded a Swiss alliance with Spain (1587) against the accession of Henry of Navarre (Henry IV) to the French throne. 

Pfyffer also acquired a substantial fortune from foreign pensions and as a supplier of mercenaries to the pope.

References

Pfyffer von Altishofen, Ludwig. in Allgemeine Deutsche Biographie, Duncker & Humblot, Leipzig 1887, pp. 727–737 (in German)
Markus Lischer Pfyffer. in: Neue Deutsche Biographie (NDB). Duncker & Humblot, Berlin 2001, p. 368
Pfyffer, Ludwig (von Altishofen) in Historischen Lexikon der Schweiz

1524 births
1594 deaths
People from Lucerne
Swiss Roman Catholics
16th-century Swiss people
Swiss mercenaries
16th-century Swiss military personnel
Swiss politicians